Anodos is a term meaning either 'ascent, way up' or 'pathless, having no road, impassable'. It may refer to:

Enlightenment (spiritual), as used by Plato
The central character in George MacDonald's fantasy novel Phantastes (1858)
Pseudonym used by the poet Mary Elizabeth Coleridge
The third phase ('ascent') of the cycle of Persephone's annual visit to Hades as imagined in the mythology and rites of the Eleusinian Mysteries
The creation of Pandora, the first woman in Greek mythology